Makenna James is an American actress, known for her role as Becca Nolan in American Woman (2018).

Career 
Makenna James was born in Los Angeles, California. In 2014, James made her acting debut when she guest-starred on How to Get Away with Murder. Since then, she has appeared on Teen Wolf, The Goldbergs, Transparent, and Community. Her breakthrough role was in 2018, when she was cast as Becca Nolan in the television series, American Woman. She plays the rebellious and intellectual daughter of Bonnie Nolan played by Alicia Silverstone.

Education 
Makenna James will attend Harvard University starting in the fall of 2018.

Filmography

References 

American television actresses
Year of birth missing (living people)
Living people
21st-century American actresses
Actresses from Los Angeles